Graissessac is a commune in the southern French department of Hérault.

Population

See also
Communes of the Hérault department

References

Communes of Hérault